Berrini is a train station on ViaMobilidade Line 9-Emerald, located in the district of Itaim Bibi in São Paulo.

History
The station was built by CPTM, during the "South Line Dinamization" project, and opened on 14 June 2000, located next to Avenida Engenheiro Luís Carlos Berrini, a tribute to engineer Luís Carlos Berrini, who named the station.

References

Railway stations opened in 2000